Chinese crab apple is a common name for several plants and may refer to:

Malus baccata
Malus hupehensis
Malus prunifolia, native to China
Malus spectabilis